Joe's Life is an American sitcom which aired on ABC from September 29, 1993, until December 15, 1993. The series was created by Bob Myer, and produced by a.k.a. Productions and Bob Myer Productions in association with Buena Vista Television.

Synopsis
The series starred Peter Onorati as Joe Gennaro, a big lug of a husband to Sandy (Mary Page Keller) and father of three who had just been laid off from his executive position at an aircraft factory. Joe was understandably miffed, as he had recently worked his way up to the position after starting out on the assembly line years earlier. His untold period of unemployment brought him the duty of being a domestic 24 hours a day, something he faced with great apprehension. In order to help the family through tough times, Sandy was forced to initially take a day and night job, leaving her away most of the time. Joe did the best he could in his new household responsibilities, but with three growing kids, it was often a wild ride. Fourteen-year-old Amy (Morgan Nagler), the oldest of Joe's brood, was the self-absorbed teen; 12-year-old Paul (Robert Gorman) was the super-confident teenage son, whose hormones always got the best of him; and cute little 7-year-old Scotty (Spencer Klein) was just carefree all the way.

Butting in on all the chaos was Joe's older brother Stan (George DiCenzo), who ran a successful, fancy seafood restaurant with his wife Barbara (Mimi Kennedy). Stan seemed to put Joe down for his choices in life and his lack of career stability, but all his disdain was quieted when he was able to offer Joe a position as an overnight chef at his restaurant. Joe gladly settled into this job, and in turn eased Sandy's schedule as she now only had to work days (primarily as an office temp). Joe still had to play the part of "Mr. Mom" during the day, leading him on a blazing trail of scrapes caused by the kids, but often Sandy would get involved right with him.

Leo (Danny Masterson) was Stan and Barbara's teenage son, who idolized his Uncle Joe, much to the dismay of his parents. Also seen were Joe's friend Frank Ruscio (Al Ruscio) and Ray Wharton (John Marshall Jones), an effete, cultured chef at the restaurant.

Cast

Main
Peter Onorati as Joe Gennaro
Mary Page Keller as Sandy Gennaro, Joe's wife
George DiCenzo as Stan Gennaro, Joe's older brother
Mimi Kennedy as Barbara Gennaro, Stan's wife
Robert Hy Gorman as Paul Gennaro, Joe & Sandy's son from second child
Spencer Klein as Scotty Gennaro, Joe & Sandy's son from third child
Morgan Nagler as Amy Gennaro, Joe & Sandy's daughter from first child
Danny Masterson as Leo Gennaro, Stan & Barbara's son

Recurring
John Marshall Jones as Ray Wharton
Al Rusico as Frank Rasico
George Coe as Grandpa
kristin Dattilo as Kelly
Staci Greason as Pregrnant Female

Episodes

External links

American Broadcasting Company original programming
1990s American sitcoms
1993 American television series debuts
1993 American television series endings
English-language television shows
Television series about families
Television series by Disney–ABC Domestic Television
Television shows set in New York City